Heliolus brevicornis is a species of beetle in the family Cerambycidae, and the only species in the genus Heliolus, which in turn is the only genus in the tribe Heliolini. It was described by Fauvel in 1906.

References

Lamiinae
Beetles described in 1906
Taxa named by Stephan von Breuning (entomologist)